The Scottish Council of Independent Schools (SCIS) is a registered Scottish charity which represents the independent school sector in Scotland. Its membership includes mainstream fee-paying independent schools and a range of schools for young people with complex additional support needs.

Background
Independent Schools in Scotland are inspected by the national school inspectorate, Education Scotland; pastoral services including nursery and boarding are regulated by the Care Inspectorate.

The majority of Scottish independent schools are registered charities, as their purpose is the advancement of education.  As such, their charitable activities are overseen by the Office of the Scottish Charity Regulator which is responsible for confirming independent schools' public benefit by means of a charity test required by the Charities and Trustee Investment (Scotland) Act 2005.
SCIS was founded in 1978 and became a company and charity in 1990. SCIS represents over 70 member schools in Scotland.

As of 2016, there were 29,647 pupils in SCIS independent schools. 1,455 of those children are in nurseries, 10,416 pupils are in primary schools and 17,786 are in senior schools.

The overall number of boarding school pupils in Scotland in 2013 was 3,072.   A SCIS sub-brand, Scotland's Boarding Schools, details the boarding sector in Scotland.

Structure
The organisation has a small staff team of six, and provides a range of Professional Learning and Development (CPD), communications and marketing for the independent sector, advice and guidance to parents and families, and liaison with the Scottish Government, Scottish Parliament, public and education bodies. It is governed by a Board composed of elected Heads, Chairs and Bursars of independent schools in membership.

The current Director of SCIS is John Edward (Scotland).

SCIS works in association with the Independent Schools Council on UK-wide matters.

Functions
The main functions of SCIS are:
 To promote, advance and support education in schools in Scotland at which full time education is provided not being schools maintained by a local education authority.
 To act as a means of communication between Independent Schools and any government department or any public or private authority or body connection with matters relating to the advancement of education, the development of curricula, the training of teachers and the development of teaching skills, methods and aids,.
 To provide advice and assistance to schools on all aspects of educational policy and the advancement of education, the development of curricula, the training of teachers and the development of teaching skills, methods and aids.
 To provide facilities for the training of teachers and development of teaching skills.

SCIS's key aims are to deliver the following specific services through CPD, regulatory and legal guidance, and additional events and publications:

Service to Schools:
 to support member schools in delivering a high quality, values-based education for all pupils 
 to provide up-to-date guidance and  advice to schools on key political, educational, pastoral, special and additional support needs, legal and financial issues
 to make information accessible to parents and young people, the media, political and community figures and the general public
 to support Governors, Heads, Bursars, teaching and support staff through the SCIS CPD programme
 to provide research to help schools with their education choices, forward planning and marketing strategies.

Promoting the Sector:
 to represent the sector at national, regional and community events concerned with the education, well-being and care of children and young people in Scotland
 to promote the sector to members of the Scottish and UK Government, the Scottish and UK Parliament, the media, national educational and other bodies, in order to foster a better and more informed understanding of the sector
 to highlight and support the particular educational and pastoral responsibilities of special schools
 to promote the sector to parents, challenge misconceptions, to encourage participation and widen access to the sector
 to secure, market and enhance the global reputation of the independent sector – including the promotion of Scotland's boarding schools.

Service to Education: 
 to contribute to the development of education in its widest sense for children and young people aged 3–18 in Scotland 
 to promote excellence in academic and all-round achievement
 to support highly qualified and well-resourced teaching and support staff
 to defend the independence, autonomy and founding principles of individual institutions
 to engage constructively with employers, further and higher education to ensure the widest choice of positive learner destinations
 to demonstrate the sector's breadth and excellence in curricular and qualification development
 to support quality improvement with proportionate, informed and responsive inspections.

Membership
SCIS represents over 70 member schools in Scotland, including:

Al Qalam Primary School, Glasgow

Albyn School, Aberdeen

Ardvreck School, Crieff

Basil Paterson Middle School, Edinburgh

Beaconhurst, Bridge of Allan

Belhaven Hill School, Dunbar

Belmont House School, Glasgow

Cargilfield Preparatory School, Edinburgh

Cedars School of Excellence, Greenock

Clifton Hall School, Edinburgh

The Compass School, Haddington

Craigclowan Preparatory School, Perth

Craigholme School, Glasgow

Dollar Academy

The Edinburgh Academy

Edinburgh Montessori Arts School

Edinburgh Steiner School

ESMS Junior School, Edinburgh

Fernhill School, Glasgow

Fettes College, Edinburgh

George Heriot's School, Edinburgh

George Watson's College, Edinburgh

The Glasgow Academy

Glenalmond College

Gordonstoun, Elgin

Hamilton College

The Hamilton School, Aberdeen

High School of Dundee

The High School of Glasgow

Hutchesons' Grammar School, Glasgow

International School of Aberdeen

Kelvinside Academy, Glasgow

Kilgraston School, Bridge of Earn

Lathallan School, Johnshaven by Montrose

Lomond School, Helensburgh

Loretto School, Musselburgh

The Mary Erskine School, Edinburgh

Merchiston Castle School, Edinburgh

Moray Steiner School, Forres

Morrison's Academy, Crieff

Queen Victoria School, Dunblane

Regius School, Edinburgh

Robert Gordon's College, Aberdeen

St Aloysius' College, Glasgow

St Columba's School, Kilmacolm

St George's School, Edinburgh

St Leonards School, St Andrews

St Margaret's School for Girls, Aberdeen

St Mary's Music School, Edinburgh

St. Mary's School, Melrose

Stewart's Melville College, Edinburgh

Strathallan School, Forgandenny

Wellington School, Ayr

Special Schools

Ardfern School, Johnstone

Closeburn House and Maben House, Dumfries

Common Thread schools, Dumfries

Corseford School, Kilbarchan

Daldorch House School & Arran House

Donaldson's School, Linlithgow

Dunedin School, Edinburgh

Falkland House School

Harmeny, Balerno, Edinburgh

Hillside School, Aberdour

Moore House Care and Education, Bathgate

The New School, Butterstone, Dunkeld

New Struan School, Alloa

Rathbone, Kilmarnock

Royal Blind School, Edinburgh

Scottish Centre for Children with Motor Impairments, Cumbernauld

Seamab School, Rumbling Bridge

Stanmore House School, Lanark

Starley Hall School, Burntisland

Troup House School, Gamrie

See also
Independent school (United Kingdom): Scotland
List of independent schools in Scotland

References

Education in Scotland